Jack Laurence Johnson (born April 7, 1987) is an American actor, best known for his performance as the character Will Robinson in the 1998 film Lost in Space.

Johnson was born in Los Angeles, California, where he lived, before attending Wesleyan University in Connecticut. His paternal grandparents were screenwriter Nunnally Johnson and actress Dorris Bowdon.

References

External links

1987 births
Wesleyan University alumni
American male film actors
Living people
Male actors from Los Angeles
American male child actors